Olfa Guenni (born 6 January 1988) is a Tunisian table tennis player. She competed in the women's singles event at the 2004 Summer Olympics.

References

1988 births
Living people
Tunisian female table tennis players
Olympic table tennis players of Tunisia
Table tennis players at the 2004 Summer Olympics
Place of birth missing (living people)
21st-century Tunisian women